Amy Grace Kane  (9 December 1879 – 9 April 1979) was a New Zealand journalist and community leader. She was born in Wellington, New Zealand, on 9 December 1879.

In the 1951 New Year Honours, Kane was appointed an Officer of the Order of the British Empire for social welfare services, especially in connection with women's organisations.

References

1879 births
1979 deaths
New Zealand journalists
People from Wellington City
New Zealand women journalists
New Zealand Officers of the Order of the British Empire
20th-century New Zealand women writers
20th-century New Zealand writers
Wellington Hospital Board members